Palestinian literature refers to the Arabic language novels, short stories and poems produced by Palestinians. Forming part of the broader genre of Arabic literature, contemporary Palestinian literature is often characterized by its heightened sense of irony and the exploration of existential themes and issues of identity. References to the subjects of resistance to occupation, exile, loss, and love and longing for homeland are also common.

Historical Origins
Palestinian literature is one of numerous Arabic literatures, but its affiliation is national, rather than territorial. While Egyptian literature is that written in Egypt, Jordanian literature is that written in Jordan etc., and up until the 1948 Arab–Israeli war, Palestinian literature was also territory-bound, since the 1948 Palestinian exodus it has become "a literature written by Palestinians" irrespective of their place of residence.

Overview

Palestinian Literature spoke to other causes of oppression and discrimination across the world. In his book, one of the foremost leaders of Palestinian literature and the person who coined the term Palestinian Resistance Literature, Ghassan Kanafani says, "In my stories I give my characters the freedom to express their own positions without reservation". This sense of international solidarity can also be found in Palestinian poets' work such as in Mahmoud Darwish's poem Cuban Chants, "And the banner in Cuba.. The rebel raises it in the Aures.. Oh a nation that feels cold", and in Samih Al-Qasim's poem, Birds Without Wings.

In the period between the 1948 Palestinian exodus and the 1967 Six-Day War, Palestinian Resistance Literature played a significant role in maintaining the Palestinian identity; forming a bridge between the two periods, which allowed the Palestinian identity to survive especially in the absence of armed resistance. In his book, Palestinian Resistance Literature Under Occupation, Ghassan Kanafani argues, "Palestinian resistance literature, just like armed resistance, shapes a new circle in the historical series which practically has not been cut throughout the last half century in the Palestinian life”.

Since 1967, most critics have theorized the existence of three "branches" of Palestinian literature, loosely divided by geographic location: 1) from inside Israel, 2) from the occupied territories, 3) from among the Palestinian diaspora throughout the Middle East.

Hannah Amit-Kochavi recognizes only two branches: that written by Palestinians from inside the State of Israel as distinct from that written outside. She also posits a temporal distinction between literature produced before 1948 and that produced thereafter. In a 2003 article published in the Studies in the Humanities journal, Steven Salaita posits a fourth branch made up of English language works, particularly those written by Palestinians in the United States, which he defines as "writing rooted in diasporic countries but focused in theme and content on Palestine." However, Maurice Ebileeni argues that a fourth branch referring exclusively to anglophone literary works is not sufficient. Rather, Palestinian displacement both in Israel/Palestine and the diaspora have led to cultural and lingual diversification among Palestinians that exceeds experiences in Arabic- and English-speaking locations. Ebileeni suggest a polylingual branch that entails works by Palestinian authors - or authors of Palestinian descent - written in English as well as Italian, Spanish, Danish, Hebrew and several other languages.

Palestinian literature can be intensely political, as underlined by writers like Salma Khadra Jayyusi and novelist Liana Badr, who have mentioned the need to give expression to the Palestinian "collective identity" and the "just case" of their struggle. There is also resistance to this school of thought, whereby Palestinian artists have "rebelled" against the demand that their art be "committed". Poet Mourid Barghouti for example, has often said that "poetry is not a civil servant, it's not a soldier, it's in nobody's employ." Rula Jebreal's novel Miral tells the story of Hind Husseini's effort to establish an orphanage in Jerusalem after the 1948 Arab–Israeli War, the Deir Yassin Massacre, and the establishment of the state of Israel.

Novels and short stories
Susan Abulhawas book Mornings in Jenin tells the story of a Palestinian family lost their homes during the 1948 war. In A Rift in Time author  Raja Shehadeh explored the relationship between the decline of the Ottoman Empire, British colonialism and Palestinian self-identity in a novel about his great-uncle Najib Nassar.
Short stories in Palestinian literature started with writers like Samira Azam.

Poetry

Poetry, using classic pre-Islamic forms, remains an extremely popular art form, often attracting Palestinian audiences in the thousands. Until 20 years ago, local folk bards reciting traditional verses were a feature of every Palestinian town.

After the 1948 Palestinian exodus, poetry was transformed into a vehicle for political activism. From among those Palestinians who became Arab citizens of Israel and after the passage of the Citizenship Law of 1952, a school of resistance poetry was born that included poets like Mahmoud Darwish, Samih al-Qasim, and Tawfiq Zayyad.

The work of these poets was largely unknown to the wider Arab world for years because of the lack of diplomatic relations between Israel and Arab governments. The situation changed after Ghassan Kanafani, another Palestinian writer in exile in Lebanon published an anthology of their work in 1966.

The work of Nathalie Handal  an award-winning poet, playwright, and writer appeared in numerous anthologies and magazines. She has been translated into twelve languages. She has promoted international literature through translation, research, and the edited The Poetry of Arab Women, an anthology that introduced several Arab women poets to a wider audience in the west.

Palestinian poets often write about the common theme of a strong affection and sense of loss and longing for a lost homeland. In a poem about the Israeli bombing of Lebanon, published in the Palestinian literary magazine al-Karmel, Mahmoud Darwish wrote:
Smoke rises from me, I reach out a hand to collect my limbs scattered from so many bodies, besieged from land and sky and sea and language. The last plane has taken off from Beirut airport and left me in front of the screen to watch
with millions of viewers
the rest of my death
As for my heart, I see it roll, like a pine cone, from Mount Lebanon, to Gaza.

Hakawati
The art of story telling was for a long time part of the cultural life in Arabic speaking countries of the Middle East. The tradition of “Tales From a Thousand and One Nights” is not an exception. In each small town or village of Palestine, itinerant story tellers called hakawati would visit and tell folk stories they knew, often in teahouses. The tales of the hakawati, once told for all ages, are now sometimes emerging from the Palestinian diaspora as children's books.

See also
 Palestine Festival of Literature
 Palestinian art
 Palestinian handicrafts
 Palestinian music
 Palestinian National Theatre
 Speak, Bird, Speak Again

References

Additional references
 Alvarado-Larroucau, Carlos, Écritures palestiniennes francophones ; Quête d’identité en espace néocolonial, Paris, Éditions L’Harmattan, coll. «Critiques littéraires», 2009. in French) 
 Abu-Remaileh, Refqa, Documenting Palestinian Presence: A Study of the Novels of Emile Habibi and the Films of Elia Suleiman. (Dissertation) University of Oxford, 2010.

External links
 Review of the anthology Qissat: Short Stories by Palestinian Women
 Google Books Sonia Nimr, Hannah Shaw, Ghada Karmi (2008) “Ghaddar the Ghoul and Other Palestinian Stories”, frances lincoln ltd, 
 Palestinian Literature: News and Reviews at IMEU.net
 Mornings in Jenin by Susan Abulhawa review

 
Literature by ethnicity